Ondřej Hyman (born 25 February 1986 in Jablonec nad Nisou) is a Czech luger who has competed since 1995. His best finish at the FIL World Luge Championships was 29th in the men's singles at Oberhof in 2008.

Hyman also finished 24th in the men's singles event at the FIL European Luge Championships 2010 in Sigulda.

He qualified for the 2010 Winter Olympics where he finished 25th in the men's singles event.

References

 FIL-Luge profile

External links
 
 
 
 

1986 births
Living people
Czech male lugers
Olympic lugers of the Czech Republic
Lugers at the 2010 Winter Olympics
Lugers at the 2014 Winter Olympics
Lugers at the 2018 Winter Olympics
Sportspeople from Jablonec nad Nisou